Bennett Maurice Gregory (October 31, 1946 – April 10, 1997) was an American football running back in the American Football League who played for the Buffalo Bills. He played college football for the Nebraska Cornhuskers.

Gregory died of a heart attack in 1997.

References

1946 births
1997 deaths
American football running backs
Buffalo Bills players
Nebraska Cornhuskers football players